The 2011 Akron Zips men's soccer team represented the University of Akron during the 2010 NCAA Division I men's soccer season. The Zips finished the season winning the 2010 NCAA Division I Men's Soccer Championship, making it the first time in their history to win the national title.

Match results

Key 

 Home team is listed on the right

Preseason

Regular season

MAC Tournament

NCAA Tournament

Team

Roster 
As of September 8, 2011

Statistics

Transfers

In

Out

Awards

References 

Akron Zips
Akron Zips men's soccer seasons
Akron Zips
Akron Zips
Akron Zips